The long-tailed mountain rat (Niviventer rapit) is a species of rodent in the family Muridae. It is endemic to Borneo and found in Indonesia and Malaysia.

References

Niviventer
Endemic fauna of Borneo
Mammals of Borneo
Rodents of Malaysia
Rodents of Indonesia
Mammals described in 1903
Taxa named by J. Lewis Bonhote
Taxonomy articles created by Polbot